Leif Gustav Skiöld (28 July 1935 – 27 October 2014) was a Swedish footballer and ice hockey player. As an ice hockey player Skiöld won three Swedish Championships with Djurgårdens IF.

Brother of Tommy Skiöld.

Playing career

Club
Skiöld played for Nynäshamns IF, AIK, Djurgårdens IF, and IFK Luleå. He was the 1962 Allsvenskan top scorer.

International
He made his international debut in the 1960–63 Nordic Football Championship match against Norway national football team. In total, he made four appearances and scored four goals.

Honours

Club 

 Djurgårdens IF 
 Division 2 Svealand: 1961
 Allsvenskan: 1964

Individual 
 Allsvenskan Top Scorer (1): 1962

References

Swedish footballers
Swedish ice hockey forwards
1935 births
2014 deaths
AIK Fotboll players
Djurgårdens IF Fotboll players
Djurgårdens IF Hockey players
IFK Luleå players
Allsvenskan players
Association football forwards
Sweden international footballers